Battimalv is an island of the Nicobar Islands.  It is part of the Indian union territory of Andaman and Nicobar Islands.

History
The island was severely affected by the tsunami that was caused by the 2004 Indian Ocean earthquake, which led to the destruction of a coconut plantation on the island that was being used by Car Nicobar families.

Geography

Battimalv falls in between Car Nicobar and Nancowry. Battimalv is remarkably flat and small, having only . 
The island lies 30 km to the south of Car Nicobar and has a lighthouse maintained by Car Nicobar people. 
The highest point of the island is a densely forested hill with a height of 73 m above sea level.
The lighthouse is a 12 meter high steel lattice, whose light is visible from a distance of more than 20 km.

Administration
Politically, Battimalv belongs to the township of Car Nicobar of Car Nicobar Taluk.

Fauna
The island is a Sanctuary for the Nicobar pigeon.

Transportation
You can reach the island by a 2-hour sail from the Dock on Keating Point.

References 

Islands of the Andaman and Nicobar Islands
Nicobar district
Nicobar Islands
Islands of India
Uninhabited islands of India
Islands of the Bay of Bengal